The Admiral Nakhimov Higher Naval School is a higher naval education institution of Russia which prepares future officers for the Russian Navy. It was created in the basis of both the Black Sea Red Banner Higher Naval Institute "Admiral Pavel Nakhimov" and the Higher Naval Engineer Institute of Sevastopol.

History

Black Sea Higher Naval Institute
The Black Sea Higher Naval Institute of Nakhimov was created in 1937 as the 2nd Naval Institute. The institute was built on an open lot that since the start of the World War I was used for coastal artillery training. The first enrolled students was conducted at the end of summer of 1937. Classed were held outdoor and in unfinished buildings. At first the cadets lived in tents that were established on a sea coast and later the "Ochakiv" steamship.

Higher Naval Engineer Institute
The Higher Naval Engineer Institute in Sevastopol was established in 1951 on the resolution of the Council of Ministers of the Soviet Union. The institute was established in place of the former Marine Cadet School that was established on July 23, 1915.

Since the fall of the USSR
The institute was created on August 19, 1992 on the resolution of the Cabinet of Ukraine as the Sevastopol Nakhimov Naval Institute. In 2009 the naval institute was renamed the Nakhimov Naval Academy.

Since 2014
In 2014, after the Annexation of Crimea by the Russian Federation, some of Academy's faculty and students were transferred to Odessa continuing instruction and their education at the Naval Faculty of the Odessa National Maritime Academy (Maritime College of Technical Fleet). At the same time, the name of the Sevastopol institution was restored as the Black Sea Red Banner Higher Naval School "Admiral Pavel Nakhimov", functioning again as a Russian Navy officer commissioning educational institution.

External links
 Nakhimov Higher Naval Institute. Ministry of Defense of Ukraine website.
 Nakhimov Naval Academy at the Academia educational portal

 
Military academies of Russia
Russian Navy
1992 establishments in Russia
Naval academies